Donald Ryder is a retired major general of the United States Army who served as United States Army Provost Marshal General from 2003 to 2006.

Biography
Ryder was commissioned into the United States Army 1971. He was promoted to major general in 2001. He served as the most senior officer in the Criminal Investigation Division, and was also the top Army Law Enforcement officer as the Army Provost Marshal General.

Taguba Report
In 2003 Ryder conducted an inquiry into abuse of prisoners in Iraq, cited in the Taguba Report. Some of the key recommendations of Ryder's report were directly contrary to the recommendations of Major General Geoffrey Miller, formerly the commander of Camp Delta.

Ryder recommended that the duties of the military police who guarded detainees should be strictly separated from the duties of the Military Intelligence officers who interrogated them.

General Miller had urged closer cooperation between guards and interrogators.  Miller had recommended that guards "set the conditions" for successful interrogation—a vague term that some critics believe was the trigger for some of the abuse some guards later committed.  Secretary of Defense Donald Rumsfeld's response to the public release of the news of the Abu Ghraib torture and prisoner abuse was to ignore Ryder and Taguba's recommendations and appoint General Miller to take over direction of the prison facilities in Iraq.  Ryder also oversaw the organization and operations of the DoD Criminal Investigation Task Force (CITF) which conducted terrorism investigations.  Ryder retired in 2007.

Awards and decorations
During his military career he was awarded: Distinguished Service Medal, Legion of Merit with two oak leaf clusters, Bronze Star Medal, Meritorious Service Medal with oak leaf cluster, Army Commendation Medal with three oak leaf clusters, Southwest Asia Service Medal with two campaign stars, Armed Forces Service Medal, Humanitarian Service Medal, and NATO Medal.

References
  Annex 19 of the Taguba Report, Taguba Report
   As Insurgency Grew, So Did Prison Abuse: Needing Intelligence, U.S. Pressed Detainees, The Washington Post, May 10, 2004
   Annex 20 of the Taguba Report, Taguba Report

Living people
Year of birth missing (living people)
United States Army generals
Recipients of the Distinguished Service Medal (US Army)
Recipients of the Legion of Merit
United States Army personnel of the Iraq War
United States Army Provost Marshal Generals
United States Army personnel of the Gulf War